Walter Lewis Baily Jr. (July 5, 1930, in Waynesburg, Pennsylvania – January 15, 2013, in Northbrook, Illinois) was an American mathematician.

Baily's research focused on areas of algebraic groups, modular forms and number-theoretical applications of automorphic forms. One of his significant works was with Armand Borel, now known as the Baily–Borel compactification, which is a compactification of a quotient of a Hermitian symmetric space by an arithmetic group (that is, a linear algebraic group over the rational numbers). Baily and Borel built on the work of Ichirō Satake and others.

Baily became a Putnam Fellow in 1952. He studied at the Massachusetts Institute of Technology (MIT), receiving a Bachelor of Science in Mathematics in 1952, after which he attended Princeton University, receiving a Masters in 1953 and a Ph.D. in Mathematics in 1955 under the direction of his thesis advisor Kunihiko Kodaira (On the Quotient of a Complex Analytic Manifold by a Discontinuous Group of Complex Analytic Self-Homomorphisms). Subsequently, he was an instructor at Princeton and then MIT. In 1957 he worked as a mathematician at Bell Laboratories. In 1957, he was appointed Assistant Professor and subsequently promoted to Professor in 1963 at the University of Chicago. He became a Professor Emeritus at the University of Chicago in 2005.

He was a member of the American Mathematical Society and the Mathematical Society of Japan. He often visited the University of Tokyo as a guest of Shokichi Iyanaga and Kunihiko Kodaira, spoke fluent Japanese and in Tokyo, 1963 married Yaeko Iseki, with whom he had a son. He owned an apartment in Tokyo for many years where he spent his summers.   In addition, he often visited Moscow and Saint Petersburg and spoke fluent Russian.

He was awarded an Alfred P. Sloan Fellowship in 1958. In 1962, he was an invited speaker at the International Congress of Mathematicians held in Stockholm (On the moduli of Abelian varieties with multiplications from an order in a totally real number field).

His doctoral students include Paul Monsky, Timothy J. Hickey and Daniel Bump.

Bibliography 
 
 
 
 
 On the orbit spaces of arithmetic groups, in: Arithmetical Algebraic Geometry (Proc. Conf. Purdue Univ., 1963), Harper and Row (1965), 4–10
 On compactifications of orbit spaces of arithmetic discontinuous groups acting on bounded symmetric domains, in: Algebraic Groups and Discontinuous Subgroups, Proceedings of Symposia in Pure Mathematics, 9, American Mathematical Society (1966), 281–295

References

External links 
 Autoren-Profil in the databank zbMATH
 Guide to the Walter Baily Papers 1930-2005 from the University of Chicago Special Collections Research Center

1930 births
2013 deaths
University of Chicago faculty
20th-century American mathematicians
People from Waynesburg, Pennsylvania
Massachusetts Institute of Technology School of Science alumni
Princeton University alumni
Putnam Fellows
Sloan Research Fellows
Algebraic geometers
Mathematicians from Pennsylvania